Western Grove is a town in Newton County, Arkansas, United States. The population was 384 at the 2010 census. It is part of the Harrison Micropolitan Statistical Area.

Geography
Western Grove is located at  (36.100876, -92.957840).

According to the United States Census Bureau, the town has a total area of 2.8 km (1.1 mi2), all land.

Major highway
 U.S. Highway 65

Demographics

2020 census

As of the 2020 United States census, there were 354 people, 186 households, and 136 families residing in the town.

2000 census
As of the census of 2000, there were 407 people, 169 households, and 126 families residing in the town.  The population density was 145.5/km (375.1/mi2).  There were 193 housing units at an average density of 69.0/km (177.9/mi2).  The racial makeup of the town was 99.51% White, and 0.49% from two or more races.

There were 169 households, out of which 37.9% had children under the age of 18 living with them, 55.0% were married couples living together, 17.8% had a female householder with no husband present, and 25.4% were non-families. 24.3% of all households were made up of individuals, and 11.8% had someone living alone who was 65 years of age or older.  The average household size was 2.41 and the average family size was 2.84.

In the town, the population was spread out, with 27.0% under the age of 18, 9.3% from 18 to 24, 29.7% from 25 to 44, 23.3% from 45 to 64, and 10.6% who were 65 years of age or older.  The median age was 34 years. For every 100 females, there were 80.1 males.  For every 100 females age 18 and over, there were 74.7 males.

The median income for a household in the town was $24,722, and the median income for a family was $30,694. Males had a median income of $25,000 versus $16,375 for females. The per capita income for the town was $12,731.  About 11.2% of families and 14.6% of the population were below the poverty line, including 27.7% of those under age 18 and 4.2% of those age 65 or over.

Education 
Western Grove is within the Ozark Mountain School District, which operates Western Grove High School.

On July 1, 2004 the former Western Grove School District consolidated into the Ozark Mountain School District.

References

External links
 Ozark Mountain School District 
 Map of Western Grove (US Census Bureau)
 Newton County Historical Society

Towns in Newton County, Arkansas
Towns in Arkansas
Harrison, Arkansas micropolitan area